Alex Phillips may refer to:

 Alex Phillips (cinematographer) (1900–1977) was a Canadian-born Mexican cinematographer
 Alex Phillips (poet), Assistant Professor and Director of Assessment and Curriculum Development at Commonwealth College
 Alexandra Phillips (Green politician) (born 1985), a Member of the European Parliament for the Green Party of England and Wales elected in the South East England region in 2019
 Alex Phillips (TV presenter) (born 1983), a Member of the European Parliament for the Brexit Party elected in the South East England region in 2019